Michigan's 1st Senate district is one of 38 districts in the Michigan Senate. It has been represented by Democrat Erika Geiss since 2023, succeeding fellow Democrat Stephanie Chang.

Geography
District 1 encompasses part of Wayne County.

2011 Apportionment Plan
District 1, as dictated by the 2011 Apportionment Plan, covered parts of Wayne County along the Canadian border, including much of Detroit as well as River Rouge, Ecorse, Wyandotte, Riverview, Trenton, Woodhaven, Gibraltar, Grosse Ile, and parts of Brownstown.

The district was split three ways among Michigan's 12th, 13th, and 14th congressional districts. It overlapped with the 1st, 2nd, 4th, 6th, 14th, and 23rd districts of the Michigan House of Representatives.

Recent election results

2018

2014

Federal and statewide results in District 1

Historical district boundaries

References 

1
Wayne County, Michigan